William Coverdale (8 July 1862 – 23 September 1934) was an English first-class cricketer, who played two matches for Yorkshire County Cricket Club in June 1888. These two matches were against the touring Australians and Kent.

Born in Pickering, North Riding of Yorkshire, England, Coverdale was a wicket-keeper, taking two catches between the two matches.  His batting was less than successful, with only two runs in two completed innings.  Yorkshire saved the match against the Australians, scoring 344 for 7 after being forced to follow on. Kent was also forced to follow on in his final match, but again good batting secured them a draw.

Coverdale died in September 1934, in Bridlington, East Riding of Yorkshire, aged 72.

References

External links
Cricinfo Profile
Cricket Archive Statistics

1862 births
1934 deaths
Yorkshire cricketers
English cricketers
People from Pickering, North Yorkshire
Wicket-keepers